Stryjewka (Belarusian: Стрыеўка, Stryjeŭka; Russian: Стриевка; Polish: Stryjówka) is a village in Belarus, in the Voranava Raion of Grodno Region.

History 
In the interwar period, the village was situated in Poland, in the Białystok Voivodeship, in the Grodno County, in the Aziory Commune. After the Soviet invasion of Poland in 1939, the village became part of the BSSR. In the years 1941-1944 it was under German occupation. Then the village was again in the BSSR. From 1991 in the Republic of Belarus.

Fight at Styjewka 
On September 20, 1943, German military police smashed the VIII Strike Cadre Battalion of the Home Army commanded by Lieutenant Zbigniew Czarnocki pseudonym "Czarny" near the village - 32 partisans died, 3 survived. As a result of the denunciation of a village resident, the Polish unit was surrounded when he stopped for the night. Earlier, he fought victorious skirmishes on the crossing over the Niemen, near Wiercielishki and in the Gluche Bagno wilderness. In Stryjewka there was a monument - an obelisk commemorating the soldiers of the "Czarny".

Cadet Bohdan Smolarski (born 1924) - son of Mieczysław - a writer (1888-1967), was posthumously awarded the Cross of Valour in 1966 by the then Minister of National Defense, Marshal of Poland Marian Spychalski.

The monument on the grave of the Home Army soldiers was erected in 1992 thanks to the efforts of the World Association of Home Army Soldiers with the support of the Council for the Protection of Struggle and Martyrdom Sites. He was looked after by members of the Society of Polish Artists from Grodno operating at the Union of Poles in Belarus. In July 2022, the monument was destroyed by the Belarusian authorities.

References

Villages in Belarus